Trees for Cities is a UK charity which aims to plant urban trees and create greener cities. Since 1993, the organisation has reported that 125,000 volunteers have planted over 1,200,000 urban trees in parks, streets, woodlands, schools, hospitals and housing estates. The charity also runs the Edible Playgrounds programme, which aims to inspire school children to grow and eat healthy food.

History
Trees for Cities was founded in 1993 by a group of four friends: Jake Kempston, Belinda Winder, Jane Bruton and Julian Blake. For the first five or so years, the charity raised funds through its well-known parties. The charity was initially called Trees for London with the charitable objectives to "advance the education of the public in the appreciation of trees and their amenity value, and in furtherance of this the planting and protection of trees everywhere, and in particular inner city areas". In 2003, the charity changed its name to Trees for Cities to reflect a growth in activities in cities across the UK and across the globe.

In 2009, Sharon Johnson replaced Graham Simmonds as Chief Executive. She was succeeded as Chief Executive by David J. Elliott in 2016.

The charity has a history of unusual office locations. Originally based on HMS Belfast, the charity now operates from Prince Consort Lodge, a Grade II listed building located in Kennington Park, Kennington, in the London Borough of Lambeth, England. It also has offices in Whitacre Mews, Kennington, London.

Function

In addition to tree planting, the charity is involved in activities with schools and community groups and undertakes campaigning.

Urban Forests 
Trees for Cities' work focuses on planting trees and greening community spaces where the social and environmental impact on local people is greatest. By engaging volunteers and planting up to 100,000 urban trees worldwide each year, the organisation is building resilience against threats facing the natural environment. Planting a range of tree species in urban areas have multiple impacts and benefits to people and the environment such as improving physical and mental wellbeing, absorbing air pollutants, sequestering carbon, masking noise, preventing flooding etc.

The charity planted its millionth urban tree in 2019.

In 2018, it played an active role in the campaign to stop the felling of Sheffield's street trees.

Edible Playgrounds 
Edible Playgrounds transform areas in school grounds into vibrant outdoor spaces that excite and teach children about growing and eating healthy food. By instilling healthy eating habits at an early age, Edible Playgrounds can help to tackle obesity, food poverty and lack of access to nature head on, as well as providing a platform for fun and engaging lessons that support the school curriculum. Independent research among participating schools shows that 72% of schools said that children were more likely to choose fruits over less healthy snacks while 94% of schools said that pupils had improved attitudes towards healthy living. Trees for Cities has worked with 100 schools in 12 towns and cities to build bespoke edible gardens over the past 10 years.

Planting Healthy Air in Schools 
Planting Healthy Air in Schools has been developed to address London's poor air quality and the detrimental health effects this has on people, especially children. London's trees remove 2,241 tons of pollution per year, making them a particularly effective barrier to the flow of toxic air. The charity is currently working in partnership with St Paul's CE Primary, named the second most polluted school in London, to enrich the grounds through tree planting and greening in order to enhance the natural environment and promote the use of the outdoor space for pupils.

International 
The charity works with local organisations and community groups around the world to focus their tree planting projects on delivering long-term, practical solutions to green polluted city environments and provide local people with the skills and ability to secure sustainable livelihoods. Since 2006 they have planted over 200,000 trees in 16 cities in 13 countries – from Ica in Peru to Nairobi in Kenya and Pokhara in Nepal.

Fundraising
Trees for Cities has a number of high-profile patrons, including Jamie Oliver, Jon Snow and Richard Rogers. The charity was responsible for the Tree-athlon, a 5k annual fun run, held in Leeds, Manchester and London. In Battersea Park on 18 September 2010, it set the world record for the largest ever barefoot race, with 278 participants completing a 100m grass circuit. The charity sends out a monthly newsletter to its followers, titled Tree Times.

Projects
Trees for Cities has projects throughout Greater London, and has delivered projects in over 30 towns and cities across the UK. The charity's global reach has extended to Ica in Peru, La Paz in Bolivia, Nairobi in Kenya and Addis Ababa in Ethiopia.

See also
The Big Tree Plant
Plant A Tree In '73
Great Trees of London, a list created by Trees for Cities after the Great Storm of 1987

References

Further reading

External links 
 
 

1993 establishments in the United Kingdom
Conservation in the United Kingdom
Environmental charities based in the United Kingdom
Environmental organisations based in London
Environmental organizations established in 1993
Non-profit organisations based in the United Kingdom
Trees of the United Kingdom